Time Bandits was a Dutch band from the 1980s, best known for their hits "I'm Specialized in You", "Endless Road" and "I'm Only Shooting Love".

The band 
The band was formed in 1981 by Dutch-born Alides Hidding, who wrote all songs and sang lead vocals. Other band members were Marco Ligtenberg (keyboards), Guus Strijbosch (bass) and Dave van den Dries (drums). Time Bandits had hits on the American dance charts with the number 6 dance hit "Live It Up" in 1982 and "I'm Only Shooting Love", which peaked at number 2 in 1985.

By the mid-1980s, Time Bandits had also achieved success in Australia, where "I'm Only Shooting Love" and "Endless Road" (where its music video was filmed) were both top 10 hits. These singles and other hits such as "Listen to the Man with the Golden Voice", "Dancing on a String" and "I'm Specialized in You" were also successful in the Netherlands, Germany, France and New Zealand (where "I'm Only Shooting Love" hit number one in June 1984).

After moving to Los Angeles from Europe in 1989, Hidding's songs have been recorded by such artists as Jennifer Rush, The Nylons, and various European performers. He has established songwriting collaborations with such writers as Charlie Midnight (producer of Hidding's last album Can't Wait for Another World together with Dan Hartman), Jackie DeShannon, Pamela Phillips Oland, Dwayne Hitchings, Donny Markowitz and Todd Smallwood.

The versatility of Hidding is reflected in his capacity to adapt to a wide range of songwriting and producing styles. His works vary from R&B, blues, dance, rock and pop.

After an absence from the stage, Hidding began touring with his new band in 2006.

From July 2022 Alides Hidding, together with his road manager, have a YouTube vlog "Roadie&Star react", where they listen to songs from the 80's until present day, and comment on the music and the music video's.

Discography

Albums
 Time Bandits (1982) (CBS Records – CX 85543)
 Tracks (1983)
 Time Bandits (1984) [Compilation] - AUS #81
 Fiction (1985) (CBS Records – 25987) - AUS #96
 Can't Wait for Another World (1987) (CBS Records – 4508782)
 Greatest Hits (1990) [Compilation]
 As Life (2003)
 Out of the Blue (2012)

Singles

References

External links
Official site of the band (in Dutch)

Musical groups established in 1981
Musical groups from Amsterdam